Melaenornis is a genus of small passerine birds in the large family Muscicapidae commonly known as the Old World flycatchers. They are restricted to sub-Saharan Africa.

Species
The genus contains the following species:

Angola slaty flycatcher, Melaenornis brunneus
White-eyed slaty flycatcher, Melaenornis fischeri
Abyssinian slaty flycatcher, Melaenornis chocolatinus
Nimba flycatcher, Melaenornis annamarulae
Yellow-eyed black flycatcher, Melaenornis ardesiacus
Northern black flycatcher, Melaenornis edolioides
Southern black flycatcher, Melaenornis pammelaina
Pale flycatcher, Melaenornis pallidus (previously in the genus Bradornis; sometimes placed in Agricola)
Chat flycatcher, Melaenornis infuscatus (previously in the genus Bradornis; sometimes placed in Agricola)
African grey flycatcher, Melaenornis microrhynchus (previously in the genus Bradornis)
Marico flycatcher, Melaenornis mariquensis (previously in the genus Bradornis)
Fiscal flycatcher, Melaenornis silens (previously in the genus Sigelus)

This genus formerly included fewer species. The results of a molecular phylogenetic study published in 2010 led to a reorganization of the Old World flycatchers family in which the four species in Bradornis and the single species in Sigelus were merged into Melaenornis.

References

Further reading
 Del Hoyo, J.; Elliot, A. & Christie D. (editors). (2006). Handbook of the Birds of the World. Volume 11: Old World Flycatchers to Old World Warblers. Lynx Edicions. .

 
Bird genera
Taxa named by George Robert Gray